Oskar Loerke (13 March 1884, Jungen – 24 February 1941, Berlin) was a German poet, prose writer, literary critic and essayist. Loerke was a prominent representative of Expressionism and magic realism in Germany.

Life and career 
Loerke was born in Jungen near Schwetz (West Prussia) in 1884, the son of a factory owner. He studied history, German, philosophy and music in Berlin from 1903. In 1906 he broke off his studies and in the same year he met his future partner Clara Westphal. Between 1908 and 1912 he undertook long journeys in Germany and France. He documented his experiences in detailed travel diaries. In 1909 he first met Moritz Heimann editor at S. Fischer Verlag.

He first appeared as a writer with the short story Vineta (1907). In 1911 his first volume of poetry was published. Loerke paved the way for nature poetry with his formally strict poems characterized by intense imagery, musicality and mythical traits. At the age of 29 he received the Kleist Prize in 1913 (together with Hermann Essig ). The prize money enabled him to travel further to Italy and to Algiers.

From 1910 to 1917, Loerke was a member of the Berlin "Thursday Society", a gathering point of artistically and intellectually progressive Berlin, where literature, music and painting were discussed.

From 1917 Loerke worked as an editor at the S. Fischer Verlag and got to know the authors of the publishing house, especially Thomas Mann . After World War I he became an enthusiastic supporter of Max Herrmann-Neiße and Walter Rheiner.

Between 1920 and 1928, numerous articles and reviews from Loerke's pen appeared in the Berlin Börsen-Courier. Between 1929 and 1932 he also contributed to the literary journal Die Kolonne, which was open to nature poetry.

In 1926 he became a member of the Prussian Academy of Arts In 1928 he received a salaried position as secretary of the "Section for Poetry". His love of music was reflected in two writings on Johann Sebastian Bach and in 1938 on Anton Bruckner.

In 1933 Loerke, who opposed Nazism, was expelled from the Prussian Academy of Arts. However, after he had signed the pledge of the most loyal followers in October 1933 - according to the testimony of his friends with the intention of protecting his Jewish publisher Samuel von Fischer, he again became a member of the "cleansed" German Academy of Poetry, a sub-department the Prussian Academy of Arts.

Loerke retired to his house in Berlin-Frohnau and remained chief editor of the “S. Fischer Verlags”, which he tried to defend against ever new repressions and censorship measures. His volumes of poetry, Der Silberdistelwald (1934), Der Wald der Welt (1936) and Der Steinpfad (1938), published in the 1930s, established his reputation as a poet of the “inner emigration" and representative of the so-called “natural magic school”.

A few months before his death he wrote, at the request of Karl Korn, for the Silesian poet and National Socialist Hermann Stehr, who died in autumn 1940 and with whom he had once been a friend, an obituary that was published in the weekly newspaper Das Reich , among others which later led to irritation, since Loerke was mistaken for one of the authors of this newspaper controlled by the Ministry of Propaganda.

Oskar Loerke died of heart failure in Berlin-Frohnau in 1941. His remains are buried in the Frohnau Cemetery. The grave was dedicated to the city of Berlin as a grave of honor until 2021. After protests, the Berlin Senate secured maintenance of the grave for another twenty years in 2021. Hermann Kasack, who was a long life friend of Loerke published many of his works posthumously.  

Loerke made a significant moral and aesthetic contribution not only to German-language, but also to world literature. Turning to ancient cultural traditions, in particular, to magic as a system of perception of the world, Loerke developed his own special image of the world and his own artistic language, which can be considered as a dialogue between the artist and the era.

Works

Poems 

 1911 Wanderschaft (darin: Blauer Abend in Berlin)
 1916 Gedichte (1929 in zweiter Auflage unter dem Titel Pansmusik)
 1921 Die heimliche Stadt
 1926 Der längste Tag
 1930 Atem der Erde. Sieben Gedichtkreise – projekt-gutenberg.org
 1934 Der Silberdistelwald
 1936 Der Wald der Welt
 1938 Magische Verse. Ausgewählt und eingeleitet von Peter Suhrkamp
 1939 Kärntner Sommer. Als Manuskript in wenigen Exemplaren gedruckt von Victor Otto Stomps
 1941 Der Steinpfad. Erschien zuerst 1938 als Manuskript in wenigen Exemplaren, gedruckt von Victor Otto Stomps
 1949 Die Abschiedshand. Letzte Gedichte.

Novels and stories 

 1907 Vineta. 
 1909 Franz Pfinz. 
 1910 Der Turmbau. 
 1919 Das Goldbergwerk. 
 1919 Chimärenreiter. 
 1919 Der Prinz und der Tiger.
 1921 Der Oger.

Literary essays and reviews 

 1922 Wandlungen eines Gedankens über die Musik und ihren Gegenstand. (Bach Aufsatz 1)
 1925 Zeitgenossen aus vielen Zeiten
 1928 Formprobleme der Lyrik
 1935 Das unsichtbare Reich. (Bach Aufsatz 2)
 1933 Die arme Öffentlichkeit des Dichters
 1935 Das alte Wagnis des Gedichtes
 1938 Anton Bruckner. Ein Charakterbild
 1939 Hausfreunde. Charakterbilder

Bibliography 

 Hermann Kasack: Loerke, Charakterbild eines Dichters. Akademie der Wissenschaften und der Literatur in Mainz. Abhandlungen der Klasse der Literatur. Band 2. Wiesbaden 1951.
 Oskar Loerke 1884–1964. Katalog: Eine Gedächtnisausstellung zum 80. Geburtstag des Dichters im Schiller-Nationalmuseum. Marbach am Neckar 1964.
 Norbert Langer: Bin ein Reim zu allen Dingen. Die Riesengebirgsreisen Oskar Loerkes. In: Sudetenland. H. 1, 1980, S. 46–51.
 Jochen Meyer: Gegenwelten: Eugen Gottlob Winkler, Gottfried Benn, Oskar Loerke. In: Klassiker in finsteren Zeiten: 1933–1945. Eine Ausstellung des Deutschen Literaturarchivs im Schiller-Nationalmuseum Marbach am Neckar, 14. Mai – 31. Oktober 1983. Band 2. 1983, S. 182–203. (Marbacher Kataloge. 38.)
 Hans Dieter Schäfer: Oskar Loerke: Winterliches Vogelfüttern. In: Gedichte und Interpretationen. Band 5: Harald Hartung (Hrsg.): Vom Naturalismus bis zur Jahrhundertmitte. Philipp Reclam jun., Stuttgart 1983

References 

1884 births
1941 deaths
20th-century German poets
German literary critics
German male poets
Magic realism writers
Expressionist poets
Academic staff of the Prussian Academy of Arts
Expressionist writers
German essayists
Humboldt University of Berlin alumni
Kleist Prize winners
People from Świecie County